The White Crow is a 2018 biographical drama film written by David Hare and directed by Ralph Fiennes. It chronicles the life and dance career of ballet dancer Rudolf Nureyev, played by Oleg Ivenko.

It is inspired by the book Rudolf Nureyev: The Life by Julie Kavanagh. The title is a reference to his childhood nickname of white crow (with a somewhat similar meaning to "black sheep" in English), because he was unusual.

Principal photography was completed in October 2017. It premiered at the 2018 Telluride Film Festival  and the 2018 BFI London Film Festival. It also screened at the Tokyo International Film Festival, Cinemania (Bulgaria) and Febiofest (Czech Republic). Ralph Fiennes received the Special Achievement Award for Outstanding Artistic Contribution at the Tokyo International Film Festival, with the film receiving a Tokyo Grand Prix nomination. The White Crow was released on 22 March 2019 in the UK (StudioCanal) and on 26 April 2019 in the US (Sony Pictures Classics).

Plot

The film shuffles through three time periods: the present (1961) in Paris, his childhood, and the beginning of Nureyev's ballet career six years earlier.

The present day in Paris: Rudi has travelled to Paris as part of the Kirov ballet company. During an arranged meeting, he befriends French dancers he read about in a magazine. During one of his dance performances, he befriends Clara Saint.

Cast

Reception

Critical response
The website's critical consensus reads, "The White Crow lacks the nimble grace of its subject, but as a reasonably diverting primer on a pivotal period in the life of a brilliant artist, it just about sticks the landing." Metacritic, which assigns a weighted average rating to reviews, gives the film a normalized score of 54 out of 100, based on 8 critics, indicating "mixed or average reviews".

The New York Times wrote, "The White Crow is a portrait of the artist as a young man, an attempt to show the complex array of factors — biographical, psychological, social, political — that led to the moment when the 23-year-old dancer made a decision that would change the history of ballet: Nureyev became Nureyev by defecting from Russia to the West at Le Bourget airport in France in June 1961 ... Throughout [the film], Fiennes and Hare suggest the extraordinary will and curiosity that drove Nureyev to dance, and to seek out art and culture wherever he could."

References

External links
 The White Crow at the British Film Institute
 
 
 

2018 films
2018 biographical drama films
2010s English-language films
2010s Russian-language films
Films directed by Ralph Fiennes
British biographical drama films
Ballet films
Films scored by Ilan Eshkeri
Films set in 1938
Films set in the 1940s
Films set in the 1950s
Films set in 1955
Films set in the 1960s
Films set in 1961
Films set in Paris
Films set in Saint Petersburg
Films set in Moscow
Films set in Russia
Films shot in Croatia
Biographical films about dancers
Cultural depictions of Russian men
Cultural depictions of dancers
Cultural depictions of classical musicians
2018 drama films
2018 multilingual films
British multilingual films
2010s British films